Dollymae is an extinct genus of conodonts.

Use in stratigraphy 
The Tournaisian, the oldest age of the Mississippian (also known as Lower Carboniferous) contains eight conodont biozones, one of which is the zone of Dollymae bouckaerti.

References

External links 
 
 

Mississippian conodonts
Conodont genera
Fossil taxa described in 1959